Google Lighthouse is an open-source, automated tool for measuring the quality of web pages. It can be run against any web page, public or requiring authentication. Google Lighthouse audits performance, accessibility, and search engine optimization factors of web pages, this is the major difference from Google PageSpeed, the Google Lighthouse provides more detail information. It also includes the ability to test progressive web applications for compliance with standards and best practices. Google Lighthouse is developed by Google and aims to help web developers, the tool can be run by using Chrome browser extension or by using terminal (command) for batch auditing a list of URLs. 

Google Lighthouse can audit webpage in desktop version and mobile version. In command mode (cmd in Windows), the developer is able to select the factors that need to be audited and other options by using the command line.

Recent versions of Google Lighthouse offer insights into how to optimize the Core Web Vitals metrics, as announced by Google engineer Addy Osmani in 2021.

See also 
 Google PageSpeed Tools

References

External links 
 Official website

Lighthouse
Free web development software
Search engine optimization
Web accessibility
Free and open-source software